Lorenzen is a surname. It is a patronymic from the name Lorenz. It is of North German, Dutch, Danish, and Norwegian origin.

People with this surname include
 Bernhard Lorenzen (1907–1983), German soldier
 Carlos Frödden Lorenzen (1887–1976), Chilean Navy officer and politician
 David Lorenzen, (born 1940), American historian
 Donald D. Lorenzen (1920–1980), member of the Los Angeles City Council
 Fred Lorenzen (born 1934), American NASCAR driver
 Henry Lorenzen (1899–1961), Danish actor
 Jared Lorenzen (1981–2019), American football player
 Lefty Lorenzen (1893–1963), American baseball player
 Mark Lorenzen (born 1966), American video game designer
 Melvyn Lorenzen (born 1994), Ugandan professional footballer
 Michael Lorenzen (born 1992), American baseball player
 Paul Lorenzen (1915–1994), German philosopher and mathematician
 Peer Lorenzen (born 1944), Danish judge
 Peter Hiort-Lorenzen (born 1943), Danish furniture designer
 Rudolf Lorenzen (1922–2013), German author
 Tyler Lorenzen (born 1985), American football player
 Ursel Lorenzen, former West German NATO Secretary
 Wolfram Lorenzen (?–2020), German pianist
James Lorenzen, born 1943, American financial advisor

See also
Lorenzo (name), surname and given name

References

Patronymic surnames
Surnames from given names